George Sussum (1803 – 10 August 1882) was an English cricketer who was associated with Cambridge Town Club and made his first-class debut in 1827, playing at that level until 1832. He was born and died in Cambridge. Sussum made nine first-class appearances, sometimes as a wicketkeeper, scoring 163 runs with a highest score of 44. He held one catch and completed four stumpings. His bowling style is not recorded but he took 47 wickets with a best performance of six in one innings.

References

1803 births
1882 deaths
English cricketers
English cricketers of 1826 to 1863
Cambridge Town Club cricketers
Sportspeople from Cambridge